The 1957 LSU Tigers football team represented Louisiana State University during the 1957 NCAA University Division football season.  Under head coach Paul Dietzel, the Tigers had a record of 5–5 with an SEC record of 4–4. It was Dietzel's third season as head coach at LSU.

Schedule

References

LSU
LSU Tigers football seasons
LSU Tigers football